The 2019 Philippine Basketball Association (PBA) Philippine Cup Finals was the best-of-7 championship series of the 2019 PBA Philippine Cup, and the conclusion of the conference's playoffs. The San Miguel Beermen and the Magnolia Hotshots competed for the 41st Philippine Cup championship and the 125th overall championship contested by the league. It was the rematch of last year's finals where San Miguel beat Magnolia in 5 games.

Background

Road to the finals

Head-to-head matchup

Series summary

Game summaries

Game 1

Game 2

Game 3

Game 4

Game 5

In Game 5, Mark Barroca hits the game-winning buzzer beater.

Streaking incident 
A man dressed in a Spider-Man costume was brought to jail after streaking during the fourth quarter. The man identified as Paolo Felizarta stormed the court holding a placard with "Vote! Love!" written on it with three minutes left in the game and accidentally hit San Miguel star center June Mar Fajardo on his right jaw. Fajardo fell down on the floor in pain as Felizarta was apprehended by security personnel at the venue. Felizarta was brought and detained at the Station 7 of the Quezon City Police District. There were two other men who were caught in the scene, namely Rayahn Paredes and Flenn John Lola. Lola was assumed to be Felizarta's accomplice while Paredes, who was sitting on the stands behind the basket, was caught punching Lola as he was ushered out of the court. Police said Lola and Paredes settled their dispute at a nearby barangay hall.

Game 6

Game 7

Rosters

{| class="toccolours" style="font-size: 95%; width: 100%;"
|-
! colspan="2" style="background-color: #; color: #; text-align: center;" | San Miguel Beermen 2019 PBA Philippine Cup roster
|- style="background-color:#; color: #; text-align: center;"
! Players !! Coaches
|-
| valign="top" |
{| class="sortable" style="background:transparent; margin:0px; width:100%;"
! Pos. !! # !! POB !! Name !! Height !! Weight !! !! College
|-

{| class="toccolours" style="font-size: 95%; width: 100%;"
|-
! colspan="2" style="background-color: #; color: #; text-align: center;" | Magnolia Hotshots 2019 PBA Philippine Cup roster
|- style="background-color:#EB1B22; color: #FFFFFF; text-align: center;"
! Players !! Coaches
|-
| valign="top" |
{| class="sortable" style="background:transparent; margin:0px; width:100%;"
! Pos. !! # !! POB !! Name !! Height !! Weight !! !! College
|-

Broadcast notes
The Philippine Cup Finals was aired on TV5 with simulcasts on PBA Rush (both in standard and high definition). 5's radio arm, Radyo5 provided the radio play-by-play coverage. 

ESPN5 provided online livestreaming via their official YouTube account using the TV5 feed.

The PBA Rush broadcast provided English-language coverage of the Finals.

Additional Game 7 crew:
Trophy presentation: 
Dugout celebration interviewer:

References

External links
PBA official website

2019
2019 PBA season
Magnolia Hotshots games
San Miguel Beermen games
PBA Philippine Cup Finals